Tantalum trialuminide (TaAl3) is an inorganic chemical compound. This compound and Ta3Al are stable, refractory, and reflective, and they have been proposed as coatings for use in infrared wave mirrors.

References

Aluminides
Tantalum compounds